Pycnarmon levinia is a moth in the family Crambidae. It was described by Caspar Stoll in 1781. It is found in Suriname, in the Brazilian states of Rio de Janeiro and Espírito Santo and in Grenada.

The wingspan is about 28 mm. Adults are bright orange, the forewings with a black spot at the base of the costa. There is a slightly curved antemedial fuscous line which is black towards the costa, as well as a discocellular lunule. The postmedial line is sinuous. The hindwings have a discocellular spot, a slightly sinuous postmedial line.

References

Spilomelinae
Moths described in 1781
Moths of the Caribbean
Moths of South America